Wayne Lum (1943–2006) was a 3-D sculptor and commercial artist. He was born in 1943 in Toronto, Ontario to first generation Chinese-Canadian grocers, Lum studied art at the Ontario College of Art and Design. He first has worked for CIII-TV and CITY-TV as an arts director, but his success was in commercial 3-D art.

His work at Toronto-based Feature Factory has graced many building in the Greater Toronto Area and beyond:

 3-D "Movie" signage and sculptors for 48 Famous Players Theatres (Silver City and Starite) in Canada
 Ming warrior tickey machines – Grauman's Chinese Theatre – Hollywood, California
 alien ticket machines – Colossus-IMAX Theatres – Vaughan, Ontario
 Fountain of Stallions sculptor – shopping centre in Dubai
 props for Stratford Festival – Stratford, Ontario
 props for St. Lawrence Centre for the Arts – Toronto, Ontario
 props for Canadian Opera Company – Toronto, Ontario
 buddha for TV movie Bethune; now at a buddhist temple in Minden, Ontario
 prototype horse – Black Stallion TV series
 graphics arts for Disney movie Strawberry Cat
 dragon sculptor at Pacific Mall – Markham, Ontario
 sculptors for the Canadian National Exhibition – Toronto, Ontario

Unmarried, Lum died on March 6, 2006, due to complications from meningitis.

References

 A sculptor who created movie magic, Lifelines – Toronto Star, July 13, 2006 pg. R9

1943 births
2006 deaths
20th-century Canadian sculptors
Canadian male sculptors
20th-century Canadian male artists
Artists from Toronto
Canadian people of Chinese descent
Neurological disease deaths in Canada
Infectious disease deaths in Canada
Deaths from meningitis